is a railway station located in Fushimi-ku, Kyoto, Kyoto Prefecture, Japan. It is connected by footbridge to nearby Kintetsu Tambabashi Station.

Lines
Keihan Electric Railway
Keihan Main Line

History
The station opened on April 15, 1910, when Keihan Electric Railway opened its first section between Gojō in Kyoto and Temmabashi in Osaka. The name of the station was originally . On July 29, 1913, the station was renamed in order to clarify that the station is not convenient for the newly raised Fushimi Momoyama Tomb of Emperor Meiji, the nearest station of which is Fushimi-Momoyama Station (as renamed from Fushimi in 1915).

Tambabashi Station was promoted to a limited express stop on July 1, 2000. Since then all types of trains on the Keihan Main Line make stop at the station.

Between 1945 and 1968 the station served trains of the Kyoto Line (Nara Electric Railway until 1963). For details, see the article "Kintetsu-Tambabashi Station".

Layout
There are two island platforms with four tracks on the ground.

Adjacent stations

References

External links 
Station map (Keihan Electric Railway) 
Tambabashi Station information (Keihan Electric Railway) 

Railway stations in Japan opened in 1910
Railway stations in Kyoto